"This Moment in Time" is a song written by Ritchie Adams and Alan Bernstein and recorded by Engelbert Humperdinck in 1978.  The song was the title track of Humperdinck's 1979 album, "This Moment In Time" and was Humperdinck's last of four number ones on the Easy Listening chart in the U.S.  "This Moment in Time" spent two weeks at number one and peaked at number fifty-eight on the Billboard Hot 100 pop chart.

See also
List of number-one adult contemporary singles of 1979 (U.S.)

References

1978 singles
1979 singles
Engelbert Humperdinck songs
1978 songs
Songs written by Ritchie Adams